The Concordia Bridge (French: Pont de la Concorde) carries Avenue Pierre-Dupuy across the St. Lawrence River between Cité du Havre, Montreal, and Parc Jean-Drapeau on Saint Helen's Island. Most of its traffic is from motorists driving to the Montreal Casino on Île Notre-Dame and continuing on Pierre Dupuy Avenue across Pont des Îles. The bridge was built for Expo 67 and was used by the Montreal Expo Express train.

See also
List of crossings of the Saint Lawrence River

References

External links
 
 Google Maps - Concorde Bridge (hybrid view)

Box girder bridges in Canada
Bridges completed in 1965
Bridges in Montreal
Bridges over the Saint Lawrence River
Expo 67
Parc Jean-Drapeau
Road bridges in Quebec
Ville-Marie, Montreal
World's fair architecture in Montreal